Smallacombe is a surname. Notable people with the surname include:

Gordon Smallacombe (1907–1957), Canadian long jumper, triple jumper, and high jumper
Patrea Smallacombe (born 1961), Australian writer
Penny Smallacombe, Head of Indigenous at Screen Australia

See also
Smallcombe, a surname from south-west England